Kleisoura is a village of the Elassona municipality. Before the 1997 local government reform it was part of the community of Valanida. The 2011 census recorded 109 inhabitants in the village.

Population
According to the 2011 census, the population of the settlement of Kleisoura was 109 people, a decrease of almost 26% compared to that of the previous census of 2001.

See also
 List of settlements in the Larissa regional unit

References

Populated places in Larissa (regional unit)